Binil Aryal is a Nepali physicist and the dean of Tribhuvan University (TU)'s Institute of Science and Technology. Previously, he served as the head of the Central Department of Physics, located in Kirtipur, Kathmandu. He was born in 1969 in Saptari District of eastern Nepal. He is also a senator of the TU assembly and a member of  the TU academic council. Aryal served as the chairperson of a working committee that drafted TU's "structure of B.Sc. four year system". 

Aryal has been working in the field of galaxy orientation and evolution. His research interest includes the origin of angular momentum or spin vectors of galaxies in the large scale structure and the structure shaping mechanism in the interstellar medium. He has published over forty papers in international journals.

He did his PhD and post doctoral work from the Institute of Astrophysics, Innsbruck University in 2002 and 2005 respectively, under the supervision of Walter Saurer. 

Aryal was awarded by "Mahendra Bidhya Bhushan Ka" by the late king Birendra Shah for securing the highest score in the M.Sc. examination. He received the Third World Academy Award (TWAS) for his Ph.D. work.

References

1969 births
Nepalese physicists
Living people
Astrophysicists
University of Innsbruck alumni
Academic staff of Tribhuvan University